Brian David Boyd (born 30 July 1952) is a professor of literature known primarily as an expert on the life and works of author Vladimir Nabokov and on literature and evolution.  He is a University Distinguished Professor in the Department of English at the University of Auckland, New Zealand.

Early life and education
Born in Belfast, Northern Ireland, Boyd emigrated to New Zealand as a child with his family in 1957.

In 1979 Boyd completed a PhD at the University of Toronto with a dissertation on Vladimir Nabokov's novel Ada or Ardor: A Family Chronicle, in the context of Nabokov's epistemology, ethics, and metaphysics. That year he took up a post-doctoral fellowship at the University of Auckland (on New Zealand novelist Maurice Gee) before being appointed a lecturer in English there in 1980.

Work
Véra Nabokov, Nabokov's widow, in 1979 invited Boyd to catalog her husband's archives, a task he completed in 1981. That year he also began researching a critical biography of Nabokov.

Nabokov’s Ada: The Place of Consciousness (1985; rev. 2001) examined Ada in its own terms and in relation to Nabokov's thought and style. Vladimir Nabokov: The Russian Years (1990) and Vladimir Nabokov: The American Years (1991) won numerous awards and widespread acclaim and have been translated into seven languages.

In the 1990s Boyd edited Nabokov's English-language fiction and memoirs for the Library of America (3 vols., 1996) and, with lepidopterist Robert Michael Pyle, Nabokov's writings on butterflies (Nabokov's Butterflies, 2000). He also began a biography of philosopher Karl Popper, and work on literature and evolution.

Boyd's 1999 book, Nabokov’s Pale Fire: The Magic of Artistic Discovery, attracted attention both for the novelty of Boyd's reading of Pale Fire and for his rejecting his own influential interpretation of the notoriously elusive novel in Vladimir Nabokov: The American Years.

In 2009 he published On the Origin of Stories: Evolution, Cognition and Fiction. Once  compared in scope with Northrop Frye’s Anatomy of Criticism (1957), On the Origin of Stories proposes that art and storytelling are adaptations and derive from play. It also shows evolutionary literary criticism in practice in studies of Homer’s Odyssey and Dr. Seuss’s Horton Hears a Who!. 

 Boyd continues to work on Nabokov, including ongoing annotations to Ada (since 1993), collected in a website (AdaOnline, since 2004), an edition of Nabokov’s verse translations (Verses and Versions, 2008), of his letters to his wife (Letters to Véra, 2014), of his uncollected essays, reviews, and interviews (Think, Write, Speak, 2019) and of his unpublished lectures on Russian literature, and also especially on Shakespeare, Jane Austen, Art Spiegelman, and Popper.

Boyd's On the Origin of Stories helped precipitate an exhibition, On the Origin of Art, at the Museum of Old and New Art (Hobart, Australia) in 2016–17, in which he was one of four co-curators, the others being Marc Changizi, Geoffrey Miller and Steven Pinker.

In November 2020, Boyd was awarded the prestigious Rutherford Medal by the Royal Society Te Apārangi. It was the first year the medal's scope was widened to include the humanities.

Major works
 Nabokov's Ada: The Place of Consciousness (1985; rev.2001)
 Vladimir Nabokov: The Russian Years (1990)
 Vladimir Nabokov: The American Years (1991)
 Nabokov's Pale Fire: The Magic of Artistic Discovery (1999)
 Nabokov's Butterflies: Unpublished and Uncollected Writings. (2000) Edited by Brian Boyd and Robert Michael Pyle
 Verses and Versions: Three Centuries of Russian Poetry Selected and Translated by Vladimir Nabokov (2008) Edited by Brian Boyd and Stanislav Shvabrin
 On the Origin of Stories: Evolution, Cognition, and Fiction (2009)
 Why Lyrics Last: Evolution, Cognition and Shakespeare's Sonnets (2012)
 Vladimir Nabokov, Letters to Véra (2014) Edited by Olga Voronina and Brian Boyd
 On the Origins of Art  (2016) With Marc Changizi, Geoffrey Miller and Steven Pinker

References

External links
Staff homepage
Ada Online – Annotations to Nabokov's novel by Boyd.
"Shade and Shape in Pale Fire" – A somewhat controversial essay on Nabokov's novel.
A 2000 interview – Conducted by Thomas Bolt.
"ON THE ORIGIN OF STORIES: Evolution, Cognition, and Fiction''"-Harvard University Press 2009
Verses and Versions' companion website – Provides Russian originals in both Cyrillic and transliterations.
"Why Lyrics Last: Evolution, Cognition and Shakespeare's Sonnets"

1952 births
Living people
20th-century biographers
Literary critics of English
New Zealand biographers
New Zealand literary critics
Northern Ireland emigrants to New Zealand
Academic staff of the University of Auckland
University of Toronto alumni
Works about Vladimir Nabokov